You may be looking for
 Selina Hastings, Countess of Huntingdon (1707–1791) British religious leader connected to the Methodist movement
 Selina Hastings (writer) (born 1945), British journalist, author and biographer